The Halcones de Morelos Fútbol Club, commonly known as Halcones, was a Mexican football club based in Cuernavaca. The club was founded in 2017.

Players

Current squad

References 

Football clubs in Morelos
Cuernavaca
Association football clubs established in 2017
2017 establishments in Mexico
Liga Premier de México